Leitza is a town and municipality located in the province and autonomous community of Navarre, northern Spain.

Notable people  
Mikel Nieve (born 26 May 1984), professional road cyclist
Aimar Sagastibelza (born 5 July 1984), footballer

External links 
 LEITZA in the Bernardo Estornés Lasa - Auñamendi Encyclopedia (Euskomedia Fundazioa) 
 Leitzako Web-orria 
 Xabier Cabezónen Leitzarango web-orria 
 Plazaola Turismo Partzuergoaren web-orria 

Municipalities in Navarre